Sergio Rolandi (9 August 1927 – 24 January 1995) was an Italian sport shooter who competed in 50 metre rifle, three positions event at the 1960 Summer Olympics.

References

1927 births
1995 deaths
Italian male sport shooters
ISSF rifle shooters
Olympic shooters of Italy
Shooters at the 1960 Summer Olympics